Cornelius Stirk is a fictional character appearing in DC Comics. He is a cannibalistic supervillian with the ability to cause fear or hallucinations through telepathy and appears as a recurring adversary of Batman.

Publication history
He first appeared in Detective Comics #592 (November 1988) and was created by Alan Grant and Norm Breyfogle.

Fictional character biography
Stirk is a supervillain who, like Scarecrow, uses fear to get to his victims. Stirk has the ability to make other people see him as someone else, allowing him to get close to his victims. He operates under the delusion that he requires the nutrients and hormones from peoples' hearts in order to stay alive, and these are best prepared with norepinephrine by inducing fear in the victim prior to death.

In his first appearance, Stirk is released from Arkham Asylum after being certified as sane. He had been confined since the age of 16 for trying to kill a classmate. After his release, Stirk subsequently stops taking his medication and begins his escalation into a serial killer.

Despite his many murders, Stirk professes to dislike violence. He also dislikes light and therefore operates almost exclusively at night. Oddly, he refers to almost everyone as "sir".

The Last Arkham
Stirk makes a brief cameo in the beginning of the four-part storyline The Last Arkham, where Jeremiah Arkham, Arkham Asylum's new director, utilizes more barbaric methods to "cure" him. When Stirk refuses to take his medication, for instance, Jeremiah has two orderlies brutally beat him with billy clubs and forces the medication down to his throat.

Knightfall
During the "Knightfall" storyline, Stirk works with the Joker in an attempt to kidnap Commissioner Gordon. However, Stirk tries to kill Gordon rather than kidnap him, much to Joker's dismay. Gordon hallucinates that Stirk is actually Batman as Stirk tried to kill Gordon with a knife. Batman stops Stirk, but Gordon is still screaming in fear. In order to capture Stirk, Batman is forced to leave a terrified Gordon with his wife, who brings him to a hospital.

Stirk later appears during the "Madmen Across the Water" storyline, taking place after his capture but before Arkham Asylum (destroyed by Bane beforehand) is rebuilt. He, along with the likes of Riddler, Ivy, and Amygdala, are instead incarcerated in Blackgate Penitentiary, and involve themselves in a softball game with the prison's "normal" criminals. During the game, Stirk is revealed to be an excellent pitcher, because the ball feels "just like a human heart".

Road to No Man's Land
Stirk makes several more cameos in the "Waxman and the Clown" story arc (Shadow of the Bat #80–82), itself part of the "Road to No Man's Land" crossover, the prequel to "No Man's Land". He is seen in the story arc offering to eat human hearts to save medication (as Arkham Asylum, in post-earthquake lockdown after the "Cataclysm" storyline, is running short of supplies). He later watches the gladiatorial match between fellow inmates Killer Croc and Pinhead, and is released with all the other inmates under Jeremiah's demand that none of them return to Gotham.

The Widening Gyre
Stirk returns in Kevin Smith's storyline, Batman: The Widening Gyre. Stirk gets the drop on a distracted Batman but Robin manages to save Batman.

Powers and abilities
Cornelius Stirk is able to cast a hypnotic aura which allows him to take on any face he chooses, generally a face that people will trust.

In other media

 Cornelius Stirk appears in the Gotham episode "Wrath of the Villains: A Legion of Horribles", portrayed by Kameron Omidian. Just like the comics, he has a cannibalistic personality. He appears as Edward Nygma's cellmate at Arkham Asylum, with both of them chained up in the same cell. In order to avoid Stirk, Nygma asks Ethel Peabody to contact Hugo Strange about a deal to stop James Gordon.
 Cornelius Stirk appears in the podcast Batman Unburied, voiced by Sam Witwer, as a former diener who becomes Gotham's newest serial killer, the Harvester.

References

External links
 Cornelius Stirk at the Unofficial Guide to the DC Universe

Characters created by Norm Breyfogle
Comics characters introduced in 1988
DC Comics metahumans
DC Comics supervillains
DC Comics male supervillains
DC Comics characters who have mental powers
DC Comics telepaths
Fictional cannibals
Fictional serial killers